Wilson Township is a township in Marion County, Kansas, United States.  As of the 2010 census, the township population was 201, including Aulne.

Geography

Cities and towns
The township contains the following settlements:
 Unincorporated community of Aulne.

Cemeteries
The township contains the following cemeteries:
 Cedar Rest Cemetery ( Marion County Home Cemetery or Poor Farm Cemetery), located in Section 16 T20S R3E.
 Spring Branch Catholic Cemetery, located in Section 21 T20S R3E.

References

Further reading

External links
 Marion County website
 City-Data.com
 Marion County maps: Current, Historic, KDOT

Townships in Marion County, Kansas
Townships in Kansas